Volcanogenic means "created by a volcano". It may refer to:

 Volcanogenic lake
 Volcanogenic massive sulfide ore deposit
 Volcanogenic tsunami

Geology